Eva Bosáková-Hlaváčková, née Věchtová (18 December 1931 – 10 January 1991) was a gymnast from Czechoslovakia whose career spanned at least from the 1954 World Championships to the 1962 World Championships. Her father was also a gymnast for the Czech national team at the 1936 Berlin Olympics.

During the time period of 1958-1962, Bosakova and her famous teammate Věra Čáslavská were always the two highest-scoring Czechoslovakian women gymnasts at the largest, most prestigious championships during those years - the 1958 World Championships, 1959 European Championships, 1960 Olympics, 1961 European Championships, and 1962 World Championships.  As a very strong "one-two punch", they continued the Czechoslovakian legacy in the sport of Women's Artistic Gymnastics established by the sport's first-ever Women's World All-Around Champion Vlasta Děkanová, and others such as Zdeňka Veřmiřovská, Matylda Pálfyová, and Zdeňka Honsová.  Bosáková and Čáslavska led the Czechoslovakian women's gymnastics team to three successive World/Olympic silver medals in a row (1958 Worlds, 1960 Olympics, 1962 Worlds), therefore being the foremost challengers to the dominant Soviet women's team during that era.

On balance beam, where she is credited for being the first woman gymnast to compete a cartwheel (at the 1956 Olympics), she was World (1962) and Olympic (1960) champion, and she was good enough on all four events combined to become All-Around silver medalist at two consecutive World Championships (1958, 1962).

After her competitive career was over, Bosakova became a member of the Czechoslovak Song and Dance Ensemble and later became a coach in her home country. She starred in the 1963 film Something Different, directed by Věra Chytilová.

See also

List of top medalists at the World Artistic Gymnastics Championships

References

External links

1931 births
1991 deaths
Czech female artistic gymnasts
Czechoslovak female artistic gymnasts
Olympic gymnasts of Czechoslovakia
Gymnasts at the 1952 Summer Olympics
Gymnasts at the 1956 Summer Olympics
Gymnasts at the 1960 Summer Olympics
Olympic gold medalists for Czechoslovakia
Olympic silver medalists for Czechoslovakia
Olympic bronze medalists for Czechoslovakia
Olympic medalists in gymnastics
World champion gymnasts
Medalists at the World Artistic Gymnastics Championships
Medalists at the 1960 Summer Olympics
Medalists at the 1956 Summer Olympics
Medalists at the 1952 Summer Olympics
Sportspeople from Mladá Boleslav